Douglas Vickers (24 July 1861 – 23 November 1937) was an English industrialist and politician. His family owned the famous Sheffield firm Vickers, Sons & Co. Ltd.

Early life
Vickers was born on 24 July 1861 in Sheffield, West Riding of Yorkshire. He was a son of Frances Mary (née Douglas) Vickers (1841–1904) and Colonel Thomas Edward Vickers (1833–1915).  His father commissioned John Singer Sargent to paint portraits of the family. Douglas' portrait was painted in 1914.

Career
He became Director of the family business in 1897, and was Master Cutler of Sheffield in 1908. He was elected as a Conservative MP for Sheffield Hallam in 1918, and held the seat until 1922.

In 1918, he succeeded his uncle as chairman of the armament firm Vickers Ltd. and served in that role until 1926 making "many valuable contributions to metallurgical science and provided funds for the investigation of new treatments for tuberculosis." He retired in 1926 when the firm merged with Sir W G Armstrong Whitworth & Co Ltd. to become Vickers Armstrongs, Ltd.

Personal life

In 1893, Vickers was married to Katharine Adelaide Chetwynd (1862–1944), a daughter of Capt. Hon. Henry Weyland Chetwynd and a granddaughter of Richard Chetwynd, 6th Viscount Chetwynd. Katharine's brother later succeeded as the 8th Viscount Chetwynd. Together, Douglas and Katharine were the parents of four children:

 Oliver Henry Douglas (1898–1928), who married Barbara Kathleen Wallace, a daughter of Falconer Lewis Wallace, DL.
 Felicity Ida Vickers (1901–1901), who died in infancy.
 Sholto Douglas Vickers (1902–1939), who married Princess Olga Alexandrovna Galitzine.
 Angus Douglas Vickers (1904–1990), a Lt. Col. in the British Army who married Phyllis Maud Francis.

He died on 23 November 1937 in Mayfair, London.  He is buried in the family plot in Brookwood Cemetery.

References

External links
 
Portrait of Douglas Vickers by John Singer Sargent

1861 births
1937 deaths
Conservative Party (UK) MPs for English constituencies
Master Cutlers
Politicians from Sheffield
UK MPs 1918–1922
Burials at Brookwood Cemetery